The Stolen Jewels is a 1908 American silent short drama film directed by D. W. Griffith.

Cast
 Harry Solter as Mr. Jenkins
 Florence Lawrence as Mrs. Jenkins
 Linda Arvidson as The Nurse
 John R. Cumpson as Smithson / Man at Broker's
 Gladys Egan as Child
 George Gebhardt as The Detective / The Mover
 D. W. Griffith as Crowd Member at Exchange
 Charles Inslee as Man at Brokers

References

External links
 

1908 films
1908 drama films
Silent American drama films
American silent short films
American black-and-white films
Films directed by D. W. Griffith
1908 short films
1900s American films